"Obsessed with You" is a song by British rapper and songwriter Central Cee. It was released on 10 September 2021 and reached number 4 in the United Kingdom, the first single from Central Cee's second mixtape 23. The song samples "Just for Me" by PinkPantheress.

Charts

Weekly charts

Year-end charts

Certifications

References

2021 songs
2021 singles
Central Cee songs
Parlophone singles
Songs written by Central Cee
Songs written by Mura Masa
UK Independent Singles Chart number-one singles